James Percival may refer to:

James Percival (rugby union) (born 1983), English rugby player
James Gates Percival (1795–1856), American poet and geologist
James Percival (assemblyman), member of the New York State Assembly 1831